Aiolos Astakou B.C. (alternate spellings: Aeolus and Astakos; Greek: Αίολος Αστακού / Αίολος Αστακός) is a Greek professional basketball club. The club is located in Astakos, Aetolia-Acarnania, Greece. The club's full name is A.M.S. Aiolos Astakou (Α.Μ.Σ. Αίολος Αστακού). The club is named after the Greek god Aeolus. The club's name can be translated into English as Aeolus Lobster.

The team competes in the Greek A2 Basket League.

History
Aiolos Astakou was founded in 1990. The club reached the lower minor league divisions of Greek basketball for the first in the 2003–04 season. The club reached the 4th-tier level Greek C Basket League, for the first time, in the 2014–15 season.

They then played in the 3rd-tier level Greek B Basket League in the 2015–16 season. They were then promoted to the 2nd-tier level Greek A2 Basket League for the 2016–17 season.

Arenas
Aiolos Astakou's permanent home arena is the Astakos Municipal Sports Center, which is located in Xiromero, Astakos. They have also temporarily played at the Vonitsa Indoor Hall, which is located in Vonitsa, while a construction project on their regular home arena was being done.

Titles
Greek 3rd Division Champion: (2016)

Roster

Notable players

 Andronikos Gizogiannis
 Nikos Kaklamanos
 Fanis Koumpouras
 Stathis Papadionysiou

References

External links
Official Team Website 

1990 establishments in Greece
Basketball teams established in 1990
Basketball teams in Greece